Aureococcus anophagefferens is a species of heterokont alga. Its cells have a single chloroplast, nucleus, and mitochondrion and an unusual exocellular polysaccharide-like layer. It causes harmful algal blooms.

References

Further reading

External links
AlgaeBase entry

Ochrophyte genera